Ottaviano Preconio, O.F.M. Conv. or Praeconio (died 18 August 1568) was a Roman Catholic prelate who served as Archbishop of Palermo (1562–1568) and Bishop of Ariano (1561–1562).

Biography
Ottaviano Preconio was ordained a priest in the Order of Friars Minor Conventual.

On 13 June 1561, he was appointed during the papacy of Pope Pius IV as Bishop of Ariano.
On 18 March 1562, he was appointed during the papacy of Pope Pius IV as Archbishop of Palermo.
He served as Archbishop of Palermo until his death on 18 August 1568.

References

External links and additional sources
 (for Chronology of Bishops) 
 (for Chronology of Bishops) 
 (for Chronology of Bishops) 
 (for Chronology of Bishops) 

16th-century Italian Roman Catholic bishops
Bishops appointed by Pope Pius IV
Bishops of Ariano
1568 deaths
Conventual Franciscan bishops
16th-century Italian Roman Catholic archbishops